Saiflabad  is a village in Kapurthala district of Punjab State, India. The village is administrated by a Sarpanch who is an elected representative of village as per the constitution of India and Panchayati raj (India).

Demography 
According to the report published by Census India in 2011, Saiflabad has 411 houses with total population of 2,018 persons of which 1,051 are male and 967 females. Literacy rate of Saiflabad is 71.28%, lower than the state average of 75.84%.  The population of children in the age group 0–6 years is 211 which is 10.46% of total population. Child sex ratio is approximately 1153, higher than the state average of 846.

Population data

References

External links
  Villages in Kapurthala
 Kapurthala Villages List

Villages in Kapurthala district